Herman Hugo (9 May 1588 – 11 September 1629) was a Jesuit priest, writer and military chaplain. His Pia desideria, a spiritual emblem book published in Antwerp in 1624, was "the most popular religious emblem book of the seventeenth century". It went through 42 Latin editions and was widely translated up to the 18th century.

Life
Herman Hugo was born in Brussels. He studied philosophy and theology at the University of Louvain. He died of plague on 11 September 1629 at Rheinsberg.

Works
 Pia desideria emblematis elegiis at affectibus SS. Patrum illunstrata, Antwerp, 1624
 Obsidio bredana, Antwerp, Plantin office, 1626. An account of the Siege of Breda (1624) by Ambrogio Spinola.
 De militia equestri antiqua et noua ad regem Philippum IV, Antwerp,  Ex Officina Plantiniana, 1630 (posthumously)

References

1588 births
1629 deaths
Jesuits of the Spanish Netherlands
Belgian military chaplains